Thabiti Naeem Davis (born March 24, 1975) is a former American football wide receiver in the National Football League and Arena Football League. He was signed by the Jacksonville Jaguars as an undrafted free agent in 1999.  He played with the New York Giants (2000–01) and saw action in Super Bowl XXXV. He played college football at Wake Forest.

Davis also played for the Orlando Predators, Detroit Fury, New Orleans VooDoo, Columbus Destroyers, Las Vegas Gladiators

He spent four seasons (2010-2013) as an Assistant Coach and Offensive Coordinator with Charlotte Mecklenburg Schools at E.E. Waddell High School and William A. Hough High School in Cornelius, NC, respectively. Under his leadership, the Huskies increased in both state and national rankings. The teams rank in state improved 102 spots (#149 to #47). In 2017, he completed his fourth season as Wide Receivers Coach and Special Teams Coordinator for the 2015 and 2016 CIAA Southern Division and Conference Champions, Winston-Salem State University football team following. As Special Teams Coordinator, Davis guided the development of two different CIAA Conference Special Teams Player of The Year.

References

External links
Columbus Destroyers bio

1975 births
Living people
American football wide receivers
Wake Forest Demon Deacons football players
Jacksonville Jaguars players
New York Giants players
Orlando Predators players
Detroit Fury players
New Orleans VooDoo players
Columbus Destroyers players
Las Vegas Gladiators players